Marçà is a municipality in the comarca of Priorat, Tarragona Province, Catalonia, Spain.

History
In medieval times, after the area had been reconquered from the Saracens, the town became part of the Barony of Entença.

The now ruined Sant Marçal monastery was founded in 1611. It was closed down due to the Ecclesiastical Confiscations of Mendizábal in 1835 during Isabella II of Spain's rule. The Desamortización or secularization of the place brought monastic life in the monastery to an end.
 
Despite having lost almost half of its population since 1900, nowadays Marçà is the third most important town in the Priorat comarca.

Villages
Les Comes, 42
Marçà, 559
El Verinxell, 20

Monuments
The 18th century Santa Maria church.

References

 Joan Asens, Guia del Priorat, Tarragona, Edicions de la Llibreria La Rambla, 1981.
 Josep Maria Gavin, Inventari d'esglésies 1. Montsià, Baix Ebre, Terra Alta, Ribera d'Ebre, Priorat, Matarranya, Barcelona, Arxiu Gavín, 1977
 Ezequiel Gort Juanpere, Història de Falset, Barcelona, Rafael Dalmau, Editor, 2003.
 Rafel Queixalós i Fucho, Marçà, reculls de la seva història, Falset, Arts Gràfiques Octavi, 1982.

External links

 Marçà Town Hall webpage
 Government data pages 
 Enciclopèdia Catalana en línia

Municipalities in Priorat
Populated places in Priorat